BBC Sessions is a 1998 release by Loudon Wainwright III. It is a compilation of BBC Radio recordings from 1971 to 1993. "Sunday Times" makes its first recorded appearance on the compilation.

Track listing
All tracks composed by Loudon Wainwright III
"Be Careful, There's a Baby in the House" 
"East Indian Princess" 
"Medley: I Know I'm Unhappy / Suicide Song / Glenville Reel" 
"A.M. World" 
"The Swimming Song" 
"Prince Hal's Dirge" 
"I Wish It Was Me"
"No" 
"Hard Day on the Planet" 
"You Don't Want to Know" 
"Sunday Times" 
"Nice Guys" 
"Harry's Wall" 
"Carmine Street" 
"Number One" 
"The Birthday Present [#1]" 
"Men" 
"A Father and a Son" 
"School Days" 
"It's Love and I Hate It" 
"One Man Guy"

Release history
CD: Strange Fruit SFRSCD073, distributed by Pinnacle
CD (U.S. release): Uni/Fuel 2000 (2000)

References

BBC Radio recordings
Loudon Wainwright III albums
1998 albums
Strange Fruit Records compilation albums